Tyahynka is a village (selo) in Beryslav Raion, Kherson Oblast, southern Ukraine. Tyahynka hosts the administration of the Tyahynka rural hromada, one of the hromadas of Ukraine. It had a population of 2,031.

History 
Since 1781, the Nikolaev church has operated in the village. It was renovated in 1807. As of 1886, 1,241 people lived in the village, which contained an Orthodox Church, a loan and savings bank, 5 benches, and an inn.

The village was harmed by the Holodomor, with the National Book of Memory of Ukraine listing 17 named victims. However, there were a total of 124 victims overall within the village, many of whose names are not known.

Archaeological findings 
In 2017, during excavations near the village, archaeologists discovered ruins of a fortress dating back to the Crimean Khanate and a medieval settlement. Among the objects found were Tatar coins, medieval utensils and ceramic objects. Through this, researchers were able to determine the village once lay within the borders of the Grand Duchy of Lithuania during the time of Grand Duke Vytautas.

Gallery

References 

Villages in Beryslav Raion
Commons category link is on Wikidata